is a Japanese football player who plays for ReinMeer Aomori.

Club statistics
Updated to 23 February 2020.

References

External links

Profile at Consadole Sapporo
Profile at SC Sagamihara

1985 births
Living people
Hosei University alumni
Association football people from Shizuoka Prefecture
Japanese footballers
J2 League players
J3 League players
Japan Football League players
Mito HollyHock players
Tokyo Verdy players
Tochigi SC players
Hokkaido Consadole Sapporo players
SC Sagamihara players
ReinMeer Aomori players
Association football midfielders